George Prince may refer to:

 George Prince (footballer) (1918–2002), Australian rules football player
 George M. Prince (died 2009), co-creator of synectics with William J. J. Gordon
 George W. Prince (1854–1939), U.S. Representative from Illinois